Vitthal Bhikaji Wagh (born 1 January 1945) is a Marathi poet, writer and artist. He is well known for writing in the Varhadi dialect, which is spoken in the Vidarbha region of Maharashtra. His career spans over five decades of writing work which includes writing poetry collections, dialogues for movies and dramas, songs, novels and one drama 'Andhar Yatra'. He is also famous for his glass craft technique, using which he decorates walls of houses using broken glasses.

Biography 
Wagh was born in the village of Hingani, Taluka Telhara in Akola district. He holds a Master of Arts degree in Marathi, and a doctorate in complete study of traditional Varhadi quotes. His novel 'Debu' depicts the life history of Gadge Maharaj. He is well known for his poem 'Kaya Matit Matit' and the corresponding song from the film Are Sansar Sansar, which depicts the condition of an Indian farmer. He has presided in the past over many literary and poet gatherings and has participated in Kavi sammelans all over the world. 
Dr. Wagh is also famous for his craft technique using broken glass. He uses broken glasses of various colours to decorate walls of houses. He has decorated walls of many of his friends and relatives. 
Dr. Wagh has carried out poet dindis and other activities in support of farmer rights.
He contested the election for president of the 89th Annual Marathi Sahitya Sammelan to be held in Pimpri Chinchwad. However he was defeated by Dr. Shripal Sabnis, about which he criticised on a possible error in the electoral process.

Works

Poetry collections 
 Saay
 Vedarbhi
 Kaya Matit Matit
 Kapashichi Chandrafule
 Pauspani
 Vrushabhsookta
 Gaavsheel
 Mateecha Zarto Dola
 Pandharichya Watewar
 Ujedache Daan Dyawe

Drama 
 Andhara Yatra

Novels 
 Debu
 Debuji
 Dr. Panjabrao Deshmukh

Films 
 Devkinandan Gopala - Plot and dialogues
 Raghu Maina - Dialogues
 Are Sansar Sansar - Song writing (Kaya Matit Matit)
 Survata - Songs
 Shambhu Mahadevacha nawas - Songs
 Dom - Song
 Zari - Song
  Vegali Vaat - Song writing (Sata Janmachi Punyai'')

Television series 
 Gotya - Plot and dialogues

References 

1945 births
Living people